Deubel is a surname. It may refer to:

Heinrich Deubel (1890–1962), German soldier, civil servant and officer in the Schutzstaffel who served as commandant of Dachau
Léon Deubel (1879–1913), French poet
Max Deubel (born 1935), German sidecar racer
Paula Deubel (1935–1993), American athlete